The 1927–28 season was the 19th in the history of the Isthmian League, an English football competition.

St Albans City were champions for the second season in a row, winning their third Isthmian League title.

League table

References

Isthmian League seasons
I